José Veiga (born 1976) is a Cape Verdean footballer.

José Veiga may also refer to:

 José Augusto Ferreira Veiga (1838–1903), Portuguese composer
 José J. Veiga (1915–1999), Brazilian writer
 José Rui Tavares da Veiga (born 1982), Cape Verdean footballer
 José Tomás Veiga, served as Minister of Foreign Affairs (Cape Verde), 1995–1996